Chen Hsin-hung; Pha̍k-fa-sṳ: Chhîn Sìn-fên, nicknamed Ashin (Pha̍k-fa-sṳ: A-sìn), born 6 December 1975, is a Taiwanese singer-songwriter, author, and the vocalist of the Taiwanese band Mayday. Ashin majored in art in college, where he also began his musical career.

He is also the founder and designer of the clothing line StayReal and a shareholder of the music label B'in Music. He was elected as a board member of the Taiwan Public Television Service in 2013.

Biography

Early life 
Ashin was born in Beitou District, Taiwan into a family of four, consisting of his parents, himself, and a younger brother. His family owned a record store, which inspired his passion for music. Ashin's childhood ambition was to become a singer, but his vocal range was too narrow. He claims his bandmates selected him to be Mayday's singer as he was the worst instrumentalist out of all of them. Ashin can play both guitar and drums.

Education 
Ashin attended a public elementary and middle school in Beitou District. After graduating from middle school, he was accepted into one of the top high schools in Taiwan, The Affiliated Senior High School of National Taiwan Normal University, where he majored in visual arts. Ashin joined the high school's guitar club and was made president the following year. It was in the guitar club that he met the other members of Mayday: Monster, Masa, and Stone. At the age of 19, he started composing. The first song, "Hao Ju Hao San", was released on Richie Jen's 2001 album "Fei Niao." After graduating from high school, Ashin attended Shih Chien University, where he majored in interior design. Mayday began to start seeing success while Ashin was still in college.

Career

SoBand 
In 1995, together with Monster and Qian You-Da (Mayday's original drummer), Ashin formed "SoBand". Shortly after the band formed, Masa came on board as the band's bassist. Ashin was both the lead vocalist and the guitarist and during their formative years the band played at a number of major bars across the country. In 1997, shortly after Stone joined the band, the members decided to change their name to Mayday. Ming joined the band later as the group's drummer.

Mayday 
Mayday first started off as an underground rock band. They sent demo tapes to the then major record labels and were spotted by renowned producer Jonathan Lee (李宗盛) of Rock Records. Mayday released their first official album in 1999 and began to gain a steady stream of fans. They released five albums under Rock Records, before teaming up with director of Rock Records, Chen Yong-Zhi(陳勇志) to found B'in Music Co. Ltd (相信音樂) in 2006.

Composer/songwriter 
Ashin used to be Mayday's sole composer; it was only during production of the band's fourth album that other band members began to contribute their own work. Ashin's compositional talents have been highly sought after by other artists and as a result he has composed a significant number of songs for other artists, such as: Fish Leong, Rene Liu, S.H.E, Jolin Tsai, JJ Lin, Richie Ren, Twins, Fran, Alien Huang, Leehom Wang, Denise Ho, Nicholas Tse, Victor Wong, Della Ding, Aska Yang, Wakin Chau, Jam Hsiao, Energy, Stefanie Sun and others.

In 2019, he collaborated with Jay Chou for the first time and released a single called Won't Cry (說好不哭), a song from his 15th studio album released on 15 July 2022, Greatest Works of Art.

Author 
Ashin published his first book, Happy.Birth.Day, in 2006. It features the lyrics of 60 of his songs, as well as a selection of his photography.

In 2008, he published "Escape to Japan", a guidebook to unconventional travelling in Japan.

In 2012, he collaborated with Ninagawa Mika and published a photography book called "Stairway to Heaven".

Influences 
Ashin's has stated that he's highly influenced by: The Beatles, Lo Ta-yu (羅大佑), Wu Bai(伍佰) and Mr. Children to name a few. He writes songs in Mandarin and Taiwanese Hokkien as his parents and grandparents are fluent in both languages.

Collaborations 
2008 - Fire to the Devil (走火入魔) with Della Ding
2009 - Fireworks (花火) with Della Ding
2012 - Fateful Opportunity (天機) with Magic Power
2013 - Dark Knight (黑暗騎士) with JJ Lin
2015 - The Future is Right Now (未來就是現在) with Magic Power
2015 - Same Answer (同一個答案) with Hush
2016 - Cheers! (乾啦 乾啦) with Richie Ren and 831
2018 - When Every Star (當每顆星星) with Huang Bo
2018 - Core (沙文) with Sandy Lam
2019 - Won't Cry (說好不哭) with Jay Chou

Commercials 
 2006: MusiQ MP3
 2007: Guerlain
 2008: 2008 Taipei International Book Exhibition
 2009: 7-Eleven – Coffee
 2011: Familymart

Books published 
 1）Happy.BIRTH.Day: Birth of Rock Poems
 2）Escape to Japan: 浪漫的逃亡
 3) Stairway to Heaven Ninagawa Mika x Ashin

References 
 
 媒體爆料五月天阿信身世　父親開過應召站！？
 太原：亚洲第一乐团“五月天”相约十月龙城

External links 

 
 

1975 births
Living people
Taiwanese Mandopop singer-songwriters
Taiwanese rock musicians
Musicians from Taipei
Shih Chien University alumni
Taiwanese idols
21st-century Taiwanese  male  singers